Alexis Mathieu (born 14 September 1999) is a French judoka.

He won a medal at the 2021 World Judo Championships.

On 12 November 2022 he won a gold medal at the 2022 European Mixed Team Judo Championships as part of team France.

References

External links
 
 

1999 births
Living people
French male judoka
21st-century French people